Christopher or Chris Fleming may refer to:

 Christopher Fleming, 8th Baron Slane (died 1517), Irish nobleman
 Christopher Fleming, 17th Baron Slane (1669–1726), member of the Irish parliament
 Christopher Fleming (surgeon) (1800–1880), Irish surgeon
 Chris Fleming (TV personality) (born 1967), American medium and television personality
 Chris Fleming (basketball) (born 1970), American basketball coach
 Chris Fleming (comedian) (born 1987), American comedian and YouTube personality